Oak Hill Academy  may refer to:

Oak Hill Academy (Maryland), Laurel, Maryland, former name of an alternative school operated by the District of Columbia for youth in its criminal justice system
Oak Hill Academy (Mississippi), West Point, Mississippi, a private non-sectarian preK–12 school
Oak Hill Academy (New Jersey), Lincroft, New Jersey, a private non-sectarian preK–8 school
Oak Hill Academy (Ohio), a school operated in the 1880s by Stephen Morgan in Oak Hill, Ohio
Oak Hill Academy (Mouth of Wilson, Virginia), a private Baptist-affiliated boarding school known for producing basketball stars